Barbara Minty (born June 11, 1953), also known as Barbara Minty McQueen, is a former fashion model who was the third wife and widow of American film star Steve McQueen.

Biography
Minty was born in Seattle, Washington, and spent several years growing up in Corvallis, Oregon, graduating from Corvallis High School in 1971.

Minty was signed with power modeling agents Eileen Ford and Nina Blanchard and became an in-demand model, gracing the covers of dozens of magazines as well as advertisements in the 1970s. McQueen saw Minty's photo in an advertisement and had his agent arrange a meeting with her. After dating for a few months, they were married on January 16, 1980, and she was by his side until his death. She is the author of a book about their time together, Steve McQueen – The Last Mile.

In 2012, Minty joined forces with the Asbestos Disease Awareness Organization in the fight to ban asbestos, which may have caused the cancer that killed her husband.

References

American biographers
Living people
1953 births
People from Corvallis, Oregon
Corvallis High School (Oregon) alumni
Writers from Seattle
Female models from Oregon
American women biographers
21st-century American women